Jumpman Junior is a platform game written by Randy Glover and published by Epyx in 1983 for the Atari 8-bit family and Commodore 64. In 1984, a port was released for ColecoVision in Australia, France, Germany, Italy and the UK. It is a follow-up to Jumpman (1983). While Jumpman has 30 levels, Jumpman Junior has 12–all of which are different from the previous game. The game was reduced in scope so it could be released in cartridge form.

Gameplay

Jumpman Junior has the same gameplay as Jumpman but with new levels. The goal is to disarm the bombs before they explode. To reach the bombs the player must navigate up platforms, ladders, and ropes by jumping and climbing. Each level has a different theme and different obstacles. There are 12 levels and 8 game speeds.

Reception
Antic liked the "excellent" graphics, and faulted it only for the way it started over from the beginning after losing a life.
Electronic Games started its review by calling the original Jumpman "a genuine classic" with levels that were "a coherently-written collection of some of the most interesting play mechanics ever devised." They conclude that the new version is "so good—the playfields are reminiscent of the original, but are all new—that even veteran Jumpmen should check it out."

Computer and Video Games rated the ColecoVision version 89% in 1989.

Legacy
In 2004, Jumpman Junior was re-released on the C64 Direct-to-TV.

References

1983 video games
Atari 8-bit family games
ColecoVision games
Commodore 64 games
Platform games
Video games about bomb disposal
Video games about terrorism
Video games developed in the United States
Single-player video games